Austrian units of measurement were used in Austria until the adoption of the metric system.

History 

In 1756, the ruling Archduchess of Austria, Maria Theresa, ordered that the Viennese klafter as well as its multiples and fractions, should be the state-defined measure of length in the Archduchy of Austria and the Kingdom of Hungary. The Viennese cubit, that is 1 of the Roman cubit (cubitus or elbow), was also used as a measure of length.

The law should also have applied to the Lands of the Bohemian Crown, of which Maria Theresa was queen. However, the traditional Roman foot remained in common use in Prague.

When the metric system was introduced by law on 23 July 1871 (which became obligatory on 1 January 1876), the length of the klafter (kl) was established as exactly 1.89648384 metres.

Measures 

Austrian post-mile, police-mile, geographic mile = 3,910 Viennese klafters.

References 

The information in this article is based on that in its German equivalent.

Systems of units
Austrian